Brian Marcus is an American-born mathematician who works in Canada. He is a professor in the department of mathematics at the University of British Columbia (UBC), where he is the site director of the Pacific Institute for the Mathematical Sciences (PIMS), a fellow of the AMS and the IEEE. He was the department head of mathematics at UBC from 2002 to 2007 and the deputy director of PIMS from 2016 to 2018.

Education and academic career
Marcus earned his Ph.D. in 1975 from the University of California, Berkeley (UC Berkeley); his supervisor was Rufus Bowen.
He then worked as an IBM Watson Postdoctoral Fellow, an associate professor at UNC Chapel Hill and a researcher at IBM Research – Almaden. He additionally held visiting associate professor positions at UC Berkeley, University of California, Santa Cruz, and Stanford University. From 2016 to 2018, he was the deputy director of the Pacific Institute for the Mathematical Sciences, where, as of 2019, he is the UBC Site Director. He is one of the representatives of the Pacific Rim Mathematical Association.

His main areas of research are ergodic theory, symbolic dynamics and information theory. He has published contributions in the theory of horocycle flows and entropy. Marcus has written over seventy research papers, some of them published in Annals of Mathematics, Inventiones Mathematicae and Journal of the AMS.  His collaborators include Wolfgang Krieger, Roy Adler, Rufus Bowen, Dominique Perrin, Jack Wolf, Yuval Peres and Sheldon Newhouse. Marcus (with Doug Lind) wrote the book An Introduction to Symbolic Dynamics and Coding (currently with more than 3,000 citations on Google Scholar), and (with Susan Williams) the Scholarpedia article on symbolic dynamics.

In 1993, Marcus was awarded the Leonard J. Abraham Prize Paper award of the IEEE. In 1999, he was elected as a fellow of the IEEE. He was named a fellow of the American Mathematical Society in 2018; the citation was "For contributions to dynamical systems, symbolic dynamics and applications to data storage problems, and service to the profession."

Selected publications

Books 
 1995: (with Doug Lind) An Introduction to Symbolic Dynamics and Coding, Cambridge University Press .

Research papers
Ergodic properties of horocycle flows for surfaces of negative curvature, Annals of Mathematics 105 (1977), 81-105 .
with Rufus Bowen: Unique  ergodicity  of  horocycle  foliations, Israel Journal of Mathematics 26 (1977) 43-67 .
The horocycle flow is mixing of all degrees, Inventiones Mathematicae 46 (1978)201-209 
with Roy Adler: Topological  entropy  and  equivalence  of  dynamical  systems, Memoirs of the American Mathematical Society 219 (1979) . 
Topological conjugacy of horocycle flows, American Journal of Mathematics (1983) 623-632 
with Selim Tuncel: Entropy at a weight-per-symbol and an imbedding theorem for Markov chains,  Inventiones Mathematicae 102  (1990),  235-266 .
with Selim Tuncel: Matrices  of  polynomials,  positivity,  and  finite  equivalence  of  Markov chains, Journal of the American Mathematical Society 6 (1993), 131- 147 .

See also 
Daniel Rudolph – American mathematician, contemporary of Brian Marcus

References 

Living people
21st-century American mathematicians
20th-century American mathematicians
Canadian mathematicians
Fellows of the American Mathematical Society
University of California, Berkeley alumni
Academic staff of the University of British Columbia
Fellow Members of the IEEE
Year of birth missing (living people)